Michael Mainhardt (born 6 January 1960) is an Australian cricketer. He played in three first-class and three List A matches for Queensland between 1980 and 1987.

See also
 List of Queensland first-class cricketers

References

External links
 

1960 births
Living people
Australian cricketers
Queensland cricketers
Cricketers from Queensland
Indigenous Australian cricketers